Money Talks is a 1926 American silent comedy film directed by Archie Mayo. The film stars Claire Windsor, Bert Roach, Owen Moore and Ned Sparks. It is written by Jessie Burns and Bernard Vorhaus, based on the story by Rupert Hughes. The film is considered partially lost.

Plot
Sam Starling (Owen Moore) is deep in debt, his wife Phoebe (Claire Windsor) is leaving him and still he is confident. When Phoebe boards a luxury yacht and is wooed by the captain, Sam comes aboard as a woman and tries to seduce the captain (in fact, a liquor smuggler), away from his wife.

Cast
 Claire Windsor as Phoebe Starling 
 Owen Moore as Sam Starling 
 Bert Roach as Oscar Waters 
 Ned Sparks as Lucius Fenton 
 Phillips Smalley as J.B. Perkins 
 Dot Farley as Mrs. Chatterton 
 Kathleen Key as Vamp 
 George Kuwa as Ah Foo

References

External links

Lost American films
Metro-Goldwyn-Mayer films
American silent feature films
American black-and-white films
1926 comedy films
1926 films
Films directed by Archie Mayo
Silent American comedy films
Films based on works by Rupert Hughes
1926 lost films
Lost comedy films
1920s American films
1920s English-language films